James William Middleton (born 15 April 1987) is an English entrepreneur. He is the younger brother of Catherine, Princess of Wales.

Born in Reading, Berkshire, Middleton was educated at St Andrew's School, Pangbourne. He briefly attended the University of Edinburgh before dropping out and founding a cake-making business. Middleton began receiving media attention during his eldest sister's relationship and subsequent marriage to Prince William. In 2013, he started a personalised greeting card company, Boomf. Middleton is a mental health advocate and has spoken about his experiences with major depressive disorder. Middleton is an ambassador for the Pets As Therapy charity.

Early life and education
James William Middleton was born on 15 April 1987 at the Royal Berkshire Hospital in Reading, the youngest child and only son of Michael Middleton (born 1949), a former British Airways flight dispatcher, and Carole Middleton (born 1955), a former flight attendant. His father came from a line of solicitors who resided in Leeds, West Yorkshire. His great-grandmother Olive Middleton was a member of the Lupton family, who were landed gentry.  His mother's family were labourers and miners from County Durham. Shortly before his birth, Middleton's parents founded Party Pieces, a mail-order party supply company, estimated to be worth £30 million, though accounts show that the company has lost £1.068 million during the COVID-19 pandemic. His elder sisters are Catherine (born 1982) and Philippa (born 1983). The family resided in Bradfield Southend, Berkshire, before moving to the nearby village of Bucklebury in 1995. Middleton was educated at St Andrew's School, Pangbourne, and Marlborough College. In 2006, he attended the University of Edinburgh, studying environmental resources management before dropping out a year later.

Career
Middleton's cake-making business, which is now defunct, was inspired by reading that a mother's baking is a highly evocative childhood memory. He supplied baking kits so home bakers would be able to get all the ingredients in one place for adventurous creations such as "football cakes". He started baking in the family kitchen and expanded into a freight container and converted barns. Themed birthday cake baking kits were distributed by his parents' company, Party Pieces.

Themed cakes were later provided for companies such as Jigsaw, 3 and Ralph Lauren. Middleton caused "shudders" at Buckingham Palace after taking part in a Hello magazine photoshoot for which he was commissioned to bake 21 cakes commemorating its 21st birthday, each iced with one of the magazine's front covers – amongst them, several members of the royal family, including Diana, Princess of Wales. The business won Smarta 100 and Haines Watts Young Entrepreneur awards. In April 2011 he registered three businesses: Nice Cakes, Nice Wine and Nice Group London and planned to expand the Cake Kit Company. The Cake Kit Company dissolved in 2015.

In 2013, Middleton founded Boomf, a company that makes personalised marshmallows and greeting cards. In 2015, the company raised £700 in funding, and was valued at £10m. Boomf made a loss of £3 million between 2015 and 2018. Middleton's brother-in-law, hedge fund manager James Matthews paid Middleton €110,000 for 12,800 Boomf shares. In 2019, Middleton announced that the company had reached profitability with an income of £176,000 in the previous year. Boomf raised $1m of funding in 2021, with plans to expand its product range. The company was sold later that year. In May 2020, Middleton launched Ella & Co, a mail order dog food company that offers freeze-dried, raw, organic dog food.

Personal life
  
Middleton is dyslexic. Middleton read from the New Revised Standard Version of the Bible at the 2011 wedding of his sister Catherine to Prince William. In 2019, he disclosed his struggles with depression and attention deficit hyperactivity disorder, which he attributed to public scrutiny from age 23 as a result of his eldest sister's relationship. He sought treatment in 2017, undertaking cognitive behavioral therapy. Middleton also spent "restorative time" at the Glen Affric Estate where he has hosted deer stalking parties. The estate is owned by his sister Philippa's father-in-law. In the same year, he penned a column in the Daily Mail about mental health.

Middleton is an ambassador for the Pets As Therapy charity, and has credited his dog, Ella, for helping him through his depression. He breeds dogs, owning six, as well as one rescue lamb. Middleton also keeps bees on the grounds of Bucklebury Manor. In April 2020, he founded the Paw Print Fund in aid of animal welfare charities.

Middleton was in a relationship with actress Donna Air from 2013 to 2018. Middleton met French financial analyst Alizée Thevenet in 2018, and announced their engagement in September 2019. They planned to wed in summer 2020 but postponed the event twice due to the COVID-19 pandemic. The couple married on 11 September 2021, in Bormes-les-Mimosas, France; his wife having worn the 1980 wedding dress belonging to Carole Middleton, her mother-in-law.

Arms

Authored articles

References

External links
 
 

1987 births
Living people
British people of English descent
Alumni of the University of Edinburgh
British bakers
English businesspeople
People educated at Marlborough College
People educated at St Andrew's School, Pangbourne
People from Bucklebury
People from Reading, Berkshire
People with dyslexia
Middleton family (British)